South Chappell Street Car Barn is a historic street car repair building located at Petersburg, Virginia. It was built between 1899 and 1903, and is a one-story, 16 bay long, rectangular brick building.  It has a steel truss roof and monitor roof window.  Also on the property is a contributing one-story frame building.

It was listed on the National Register of Historic Places in 2009.

References

Industrial buildings and structures on the National Register of Historic Places in Virginia
Industrial buildings completed in 1903
Buildings and structures in Petersburg, Virginia
Transportation in Petersburg, Virginia
National Register of Historic Places in Petersburg, Virginia